Penèlope di Lella (born 17 April 1974) is a Dutch short track speed skater. She competed in three events at the 1994 Winter Olympics.

References

1974 births
Living people
Dutch female short track speed skaters
Olympic short track speed skaters of the Netherlands
Short track speed skaters at the 1994 Winter Olympics
Sportspeople from The Hague